In audio signal processing and acoustics, an echo is a reflection of sound that arrives at the listener with a delay after the direct sound. The delay is directly proportional to the distance of the reflecting surface from the source and the listener. Typical examples are the echo produced by the bottom of a well, by a building, or by the walls of an enclosed room and an empty room. A true echo is a single reflection of the sound source.

The word echo derives from the Greek ἠχώ (ēchō), itself from ἦχος (ēchos), "sound". Echo in the Greek folk story is a mountain nymph whose ability to speak was cursed, leaving her able only to repeat the last words spoken to her. Some animals use echo for location sensing and navigation, such as cetaceans (dolphins and whales) and bats in a process known as echolocation. Echoes are also the basis of Sonar technology.

Acoustic phenomenon
Acoustic waves are reflected by walls or other hard surfaces, such as mountains and privacy fences. The reason of reflection may be explained as a discontinuity in the propagation medium. This can be heard when the reflection returns with sufficient magnitude and delay to be perceived distinctly.
When sound, or the echo itself, is reflected multiple times from multiple surfaces, the echo is characterized as a reverberation.

The human ear cannot distinguish echo from the original direct sound if the delay is less than 1/10 of a second. In nature, canyon walls or rock cliffs facing water are the most common natural settings for hearing echoes. The strength of echo is frequently measured in dB sound pressure level (SPL) relative to the directly transmitted wave. Echoes may be desirable (as in sonar) or undesirable (as in telephone systems).

Echo in music
In music performance and recording, electric echo effects have been used since the 1950s. The Echoplex is a tape delay effect, first made in 1959 that recreates the sound of an acoustic echo. Designed by Mike Battle, the Echoplex set a standard for the effect in the 1960s and was used by most of the notable guitar players of the era; original Echoplexes are highly sought after. While Echoplexes were used heavily by guitar players (and the occasional bass player, such as Chuck Rainey, or trumpeter, such as Don Ellis), many recording studios also used the Echoplex. Beginning in the 1970s, Market built the solid-state Echoplex for Maestro. In the 2000s, most echo effects units use electronic or digital circuitry to recreate the echo effect.

Famous echoes

 Inchindown oil tanks, current record holder for longest reverberation.
 Hamilton Mausoleum, Hamilton, South Lanarkshire, Scotland: Its high stone means it takes 15 seconds for the sound of a slammed door to delay.
 Gol Gumbaz of Bijapur, India: Any whisper, clap or sound gets echoed repeatedly.
 The Golkonda Fort of Hyderabad, India
 The Echo Wall at the Temple of Heaven, Beijing, China
 The Whispering Gallery of St Paul's Cathedral, London, England, UK
 Echo Point, the Three Sisters, Katoomba, Australia
 The Temple of Kukulcan El Castillo, Chichen Itza, Mexico
 The Baptistry of Pisa, Pisa, Italy
 The echo near Milan visited by Mark Twain in The Innocents Abroad
 The echo in Chinon, France which is used in a traditional local rhyme
 The gazebo of Napier Museum in Trivandrum, Kerala, India

See also
 Light echo

References

External links

 More information on Chinon echo. 
 Listen to Duck echoes and an animated demonstration of how an echo is formed. 

Acoustics
Audio effects